The Iron Hand of the Mafia is a 1980 Italian film directed by Roberto Girometti.

Plot
The heirs of the old mafia give rise to a bloody struggle to secure the monopoly on organized crime.

Style
Despite the films title, there is no mafia in the film The Iron Hand of the Mafia. The film is actually a Sceneggiata film.

Production
Actress Mafia Margit Evelyn Newton choreographed a fight scene with co-star Malisa Longo along with the director and Longo.

Release
The Iron Hand of the Mafia was released on November 28, 1980 where it was distributed by Samanda.

Reception
In his book Italian Crime Filmography, 1968-1980, Roberto Curti described the film as "third grade material" with poor direction, grating comic relief from Angrisano and Shiavone and the films "non-existent pacing."

Notes

References

External links

1980 films
1980s crime films
Italian crime films
1980s Italian films